Grindelia vetimontis is a rare North American species of flowering plants in the family Asteraceae. It is native to northeastern Mexico, found only in the State of Nuevo León.

Each head has 22-24 ray flowers surrounding numerous disc flowers.

References

External links
photo of herbarium specimen collected in Nuevo León in 1992

vetimontis
Flora of Nuevo León
Plants described in 1990